Francesca Francolini (born 27 December 1979) is an Italian softball player who competed in the 2000 Summer Olympics and in the 2004 Summer Olympics.

References

1979 births
Living people
Italian softball players
Olympic softball players of Italy
Softball players at the 2000 Summer Olympics
Softball players at the 2004 Summer Olympics